The following lists events that happened during 1997 in Laos.

Incumbents
President: Nouhak Phoumsavanh 
Vice President: Sisavath Keobounphanh 
Prime Minister: Khamtai Siphandon

Events

July
23 July — Laos is admitted to the ASEAN.

December
21 December - 1997 Laotian parliamentary election

References

 
Years of the 20th century in Laos
Laos
1990s in Laos
Laos